What the World Needs Now: Stan Getz Plays Burt Bacharach and Hal David is an album by saxophonist Stan Getz which was released on the Verve label in 1968.

Reception

The Allmusic review by Richard S. Ginell stated "this isn't one of Getz's better gigs; his tone is not in the best of shape, and he sounds bored with some of the tunes".

Track listing
All compositions by Burt Bacharach and Hal David except where noted.
 "Wives and Lovers" - 3:36
 "The Windows of the World" - 2:43
 "The Look of Love" - 2:39
 "Any Old Time of Day" - 3:33 		
 "Alfie" - 2:51
 "In Times Like These" - 2:44
 "A House Is Not a Home" - 4:13
 "Trains and Boats and Planes" - 3:01
 "What the World Needs Now Is Love" - 2:58
 "In Between the Heartaches" [edited master take] - 2:17
 "Walk on By" - 3:32
 "A House Is Not a Home" [alternate take] - 4:25 Bonus track on CD reissue
 "In Between the Heartaches" [partial alternate take] - 2:35 Bonus track on CD reissue
 "My Own True Love" (Max Steiner, Mack David) - 2:29 Bonus track on CD reissue
 "Tara's Theme" (Max Steiner) - 2:36 Bonus track on CD reissue
Recorded at Van Gelder Studio in Englewood Cliffs, New Jersey on December 2, 1966 (tracks 3, 14 & 15), at Ter-Mar Recording Studio in Chicago, Illinois on August 30 & 31, 1967 (tracks 1, 2, 4, 6-8, 11 & 12), and A&R Recording Studio, New York City (tracks 5, 9, 10 & 13)

Personnel 
Stan Getz - tenor saxophone
Jim Buffington - French horn (tracks 5, 9, 10 & 13)
Jerome Richardson - woodwinds (tracks 5, 9, 10 & 13)
Chick Corea (tracks 1, 2, 4, 6-8, 11 & 12), Herbie Hancock (tracks 3, 5, 9, 10 & 13-15) - piano
Kenny Burrell (tracks 5, 9, 10 & 13), Jim Hall (tracks: 3, 14 & 15), Phil Upchurch (tracks 1, 2, 4, 6-8, 11 & 12) - guitar
Gloria Agostini - harp (tracks 5, 9, 10 & 13)
Walter Booker (tracks 1, 2, 4, 6-8, 11 & 12), Ron Carter (tracks 3, 5, 9, 10 & 13-15) - bass
David Carey - vibraphone (tracks 5, 9, 10 & 13)
Bill Horwath - cimbalom (tracks 3, 14 & 15)
Roy Haynes (tracks 1, 2, 4, 6-8, 11 & 12), Grady Tate (tracks 3, 5, 9, 10 & 13-15) - drums
Artie Butler, Bobby Rosengarden - percussion (tracks 3, 14 & 15)
Paul Gershman, David Mankovitz, David Nadien, Gerald Tarack - violin (tracks 5, 9, 10 & 13)
Bernard Zaslav - viola (tracks 5, 9, 10 & 13)
Charles McCracken - cello (tracks 5, 9, 10 & 13)
Additional unidentified brass, strings and chorus arranged and conducted by Claus Ogerman (tracks 3, 14 & 15) and Richard Evans (tracks 1, 2 & 4-13)

References 

1968 albums
Stan Getz albums
Verve Records albums
Albums produced by Esmond Edwards
Burt Bacharach tribute albums
Albums arranged by Claus Ogerman
Albums conducted by Claus Ogerman
Albums recorded at Van Gelder Studio